Gunda is a rural locality (a settlement) and the administrative centre of Gundisnkoye Rural Settlement, Yeravninsky District, Republic of Buryatia, Russia. The population was 1,093 as of 2017. There are 22 streets.

Geography 
Gunda is located by Gunda lake, part of the Yeravna-Khorga Lake System, 37 km northeast of Sosnovo-Ozerskoye (the district's administrative centre) by road. Khorga is the nearest rural locality.

References 

Rural localities in Yeravninsky District